SkyDrive may refer to:

 OneDrive, a Microsoft file hosting service, which was renamed from SkyDrive in February 2014
 SkyDrive (eVTOL), a Japanese flying car company.